The Belgian American Football League (BAFL) is a sports league for American football in Belgium founded in 1987. The league currently consists of 18 teams from Belgian cities and regions and one team from Luxembourg. The league is divided into two conferences—the Flemish American Football League (FAFL) and Ligue Francophone de Football Americain de Belgique (LFFAB). At the end of each regular season, three teams from each conference play in the BFL playoffs, a six-team single-elimination tournament that culminates with the championship game, known as the Belgian Bowl.

Seasons

Football rules

The BFL uses the American college football rules: (2013/2014 NCAA Rulebook). These differ from the popular professional league of the United States, the NFL. The officials are organised in the Belgian american football officials committee (BAFOC).

The conferences
The BFL is divided into a Dutch-speaking conference and a French-speaking conference, based on the northern Flemish Community and the southern French Community of Belgium. These two communities intermingle in the territory of Brussels, two teams based in Brussels play in the Dutch (FAFL) and one team plays in the French (LFFAB). The LFFAB has one team from Luxembourg, the Steelers. The conferences are important for the championship game as they determine who will participate in the play-offs. Teams only play interconference games in the play-offs.

Teams
There are 18 BFL teams. The La Louvière Wolves are on hold. New teams must be located 20 km from an existing team. This rule does not apply for Brussels.

Team locations

BFL Records
 Most national championships:
 8 West Flanders Tribes (2000, 2001, 2006-2011)
 Most appearances in a national championship:
  12 Brussels Black Angels (1996-1998, 2003, 2005, 2007, 2008, 2011, 2015-2018)
 Most consecutive national championships:
  6 West Flanders Tribes (2006-2011)
 Most consecutive appearances in a national championship:
  6 West Flanders Tribes (2006-2011)
 Most consecutive appearances in the playoffs:
  10 Brussels Black Angels (2001-2011)
 Most consecutive wins:
  50 West Flanders Tribes (27 February 2007 - 4 June 2011)
 Longest streak no losses:
  53 West Flanders Tribes (21 May 2006 - 4 June 2011)
 Most consecutive perfect seasons:
  4 West Flanders Tribes (2008-2011)
 Most consecutive unbeaten seasons:
  5 West Flanders Tribes (2007-2011)

See also
 American Football Bond Nederland

References

External links
  Official FAFL website
  Official LFFAB website
 Official BAFOC website
 Dale's FAFL thoughts - FAFL Blog

American football in Belgium
American football leagues in Europe
1987 establishments in Belgium
Sports leagues established in 1987